Mammadagha Ahmad oghlu Mammadov (May 30, 1926 — January 23, 1971) was an Azerbaijani-Soviet chemist, technologist and statesman, Minister of Oil Refining and Petrochemical Industry of the Azerbaijan SSR.

Biography 
M. Mammadov was born on May 30, 1926, in Baku. After graduating from high school in 1943, he entered the technology faculty of the M. Azizbeyov Azerbaijan Institute of Oil and Chemistry, and also worked in the field of production. After graduating in 1949, he was sent to work as an operator at the XXII Congress of the CPSU Baku Refinery, where he was promoted to chief of the plant, and later promoted to party secretary of the Central Committee of the CPSU.

In 1955–1959, Mammadaga Mammadov was the deputy head of the oil industry department of the Central Committee of the Azerbaijan Communist Party, in 1959–1961, the chief engineer and deputy chief of the Union of Oil Plants of the National Economic Council of the Azerbaijan SSR, and in 1961-1965 he was the head of the Oil Refining and Chemical Industry Department of the Azerbaijan SSR, in 1965-1967 he was the First Deputy Minister of Oil Refining and Petrochemical Industry of the Azerbaijan SSR, and in 1967-1971, he was the Minister of Oil Refining and Petrochemical Industry of the Azerbaijan SSR.

Mammadaga Mammadov worked on the development of additives technology for lubricants and the organization of production, and was the author of a number of scientific works in this field. He was an associate professor of the M. Azizbeyov Azerbaijan Institute of Oil and Chemistry, and in 1967 he received the degree of candidate of technical sciences.

Mammadaga Mammadov, a member of the CPSU since 1946, was repeatedly elected a member of the Baku city and Shaumyan district party committees and a deputy of the Baku Soviet. He died on January 23, 1971, in Baku.

Awards 
 Honored Engineer of the Azerbaijan SSR — 1964
 Honored Inventor of the Azerbaijan SSR — May 24, 1960
 Stalin Prize (3rd degree) — 1951
 Order of Lenin
 Order of the Badge of Honour

References 

Recipients of the Order of Lenin
Azerbaijan State Oil and Industry University alumni
Burials at Alley of Honor
Azerbaijani chemists
Stalin Prize winners
1926 births
1971 deaths